Evan Kleiman is a chef, author, radio host and restaurant owner. She has been the radio host of Good Food on KCRW since 1997. In 2012, her radio show received the Best Audio Series award from the IACP. In 2017, Kleiman was inducted into the James Beard Who's Who of Food and Beverage in America. Kleiman grew up in Los Angeles and earned a bachelor's degree and MA at UCLA. She opened Angeli Caffe in 1984. Angeli Caffe, which served Italian food, closed after 28 years. Kleiman is the author of eight books on Italian food as well as one app, "Easy as Pie." Kleiman also moderated Food, Inc., an award-winning documentary, has taught college classes on the topic of food sustainability, gives culinary tours in Italy, and was the founder of L.A.’s chapter of Slow Food.

References 

American chefs
Radio personalities from California
Writers from California
American food writers
Living people
Year of birth missing (living people)
Place of birth missing (living people)
American restaurateurs
People from Los Angeles
University of California, Los Angeles alumni